Ciarán McGrath (born 25 February 1985) is a Gaelic footballer who plays for Galway, since making his Championship debut in the 2012 Connacht Senior Football Quarter Final against Roscommon.

References

1985 births
Living people
Corofin Gaelic footballers
Galway inter-county Gaelic footballers
People from Galway (city)
Garda Síochána officers